William Hanley (October 22, 1931 – May 25, 2012) was an American playwright, novelist, and scriptwriter, born in Lorain, Ohio. Hanley wrote plays for the theatre, radio and television and published three novels in the 1970s. He was related to the British writers James and Gerald Hanley, and the actress Ellen Hanley was his sister.

Life
William G. Hanley was born on October 22, 1931, Lorain, Ohio, one of three children of William Gerald and Anne Rodgers Hanley. William Hanley, Sr. was born in Liverpool, England in 1899, of Irish Catholic immigrants. He was a seaman prior to settling in the US, and then worked as a housepainter. Shortly after Hanley's birth the family moved to Queens, New York. Hanley attended Cornell for a year, then served in the Army in the early 1950s, before enrolling at the American Academy of Dramatic Arts, though he never pursued an acting career. He worked as a bank clerk, mail clerk, factory worker, and book salesman while writing his early scripts. William Hanley married Shelley Post, 1956 (divorced, 1961), and married Pat Stanley, 1962 (divorced, 1978).

The actress Ellen Hanley (1926–2007) was his sister. She is best known for playing Fiorello La Guardia's first wife in the 1959 Broadway musical "Fiorello!" The British novelist and playwright James Hanley (1897–1985) was his father William's brother. In addition to writing many novels James Hanley also wrote plays for the theatre, radio and television. Another brother was the novelist and script writer Gerald Hanley (1916–1992).

William Hanley died May 25, 2012, after suffering a fall in his home in Ridgefield, Connecticut and was buried jn the family plot at Mapleshade Cemetery, next to his parents and sister. He was 80.

Works
Hanley was a successful Broadway and off Broadway playwright in the 1960s. Howard Taubman wrote in The New York Times in 1962, that Hanley was "an uncommonly gifted writer." But the accolades, and a Tony nomination, did not provide commercial success. Slow Dance on the Killing Ground ran for 88 performances, the Off-Broadway plays had closed within a month. However Hanley, subsequently he had a successful career in television, beginning with Flesh and Blood which was originally a stage play that Hanley sold in 1966, to NBC for $112,500, "at the time the most that television had paid an author for a single work". Over a period of thirty years Hanley wrote more than two dozen TV scripts. He also published three novels in the 1970s. He was the original screenwriter on The Graduate (1967), but walked off the project after getting notes he didn't agree with from director Mike Nichols.

Reputation
He was nominated for Emmys five times and won twice: a 1984 ABC movie Something About Amelia and in 1988 for the mini-series The Attic: The Hiding of Anne Frank, which starred Paul Scofield, Mary Steenburgen and, as Anne, Lisa Jacobs. Something About Amelia also won a 1984 Golden Globe Award for Best Television Limited Series or Motion Picture made for Television.

Novels
 Blue Dreams. Delacorte Press, New York, 1971
 Mixed Feelings. Garden City: Doubleday & Co., 1972
 Leaving Mount Venus. Ballantine Books, 1977

Stage plays 
 Whisper into My Good Ear. Cast Theater, New York, October 1, 1962
  Mrs. Dally Has a Lover and Other Plays. October 1, 1962
 Conversations in the Dark. Produced in Philadelphia, Pa. at Walnut Street Theatre, December 23, 1963
 Slow Dance on the Killing Ground. Produced on Broadway at Plymouth Theatre, November 30, 1964; Greenwich Theatre, London, England: Opened November 11, 1991.
 Today Is Independence Day. First produced Berlin, Germany 1963; New York? September 22, 1965

Published plays (including anthologies) 
 Mrs Dally Has a Lover and Other Plays. New York: Dial Press, 1963. (Mrs Dally Has a Lover; Today is Independence Day; Whisper in My Good Ear).
 Whisper in My Good Ear [and] Mrs. Dally Has a Lover; Two plays, Dramatists Play Service. 1963
 Slow Dance on the Killing Ground. New York: Random House, 1964
 No Answer. New York: Random House, 1968 (also in the anthology Collison Course—see below)
 Flesh and Blood. New York: Dramatists Play Service, 1968
 The Best Plays of 1964–1965, edited by Otis L.  Guernsey, Jr. Dodd, 1965
 New Theater in America, Vol. 1. New York: Delta, 1965
 Collision Course, edited by Edward Parone. New York: Random House, 1968
 Best American Plays, Sixth Series, edited by John Gassner and Clive Barnes. New York: Crown Publishing, 1971

Screenplay 
 The Gypsy Moths (1969)

Plays for television 
 1968 Flesh and Blood (TV movie)
 1973 Mrs. Dally Has a Lover (TV movie)
 1975 Whisper into My Good Ear (TV movie)
 1977 Testimony of Two Men (TV mini-series)
 1978  Who'll Save Our Children? (TV movie)
 1979 Too Far to Go  (TV movie)
 1980 Father Figure (TV movie)
 1980 The Silent Lovers (TV movie) (teleplay)
 1980 The Scarlett O'Hara War (TV movie) (teleplay)
 1982 Little Gloria... Happy at Last
 1984 Something About Amelia (Won Emmy).
 1984 Celebrity
 1987 When the Time Comes (TV movie)
 1987 Nutcracker: Money, Madness & Murder (TV mini-series)
 1988 Tales from the Hollywood Hills: Golden Land (TV movie)   (teleplay)
 1988 The Attic: The Hiding of Anne Frank (TV movie)
 1990 The Kennedys of Massachusetts (TV mini-series)
 1991 Our Sons (TV movie) (written by)
 1991 In Broad Daylight (TV movie) (teleplay)
 1991The Last to Go (TV movie) (teleplay)
 1994 Scarlett (TV mini-series)
 1997 Ellen Foster (TV movie) (teleplay)
 1997 Passion's Way
 1998 The Long Way Home (TV movie) (teleplay)
 1999 The Reef (teleplay)

Radio play 
 A Country without Rain (1970)

Awards
 1963 Vernon Rice Award
 1965 John Gassner Award
 1988 Emmy: The Attic: The Hiding of Anne Frank. Outstanding Writing in a Miniseries or a Special
 1988 Edgar Award: Best Mystery TV Episode: Winner: Nutcracker: Money, Murder, and Madness

References

External links

William Hanley scripts, 1957–1996 [bulk 1957–1976], held by the Billy Rose Theatre Division, New York Public Library for the Performing Arts

1931 births
2012 deaths
American male screenwriters
Edgar Award winners
Primetime Emmy Award winners
People from Lorain, Ohio
Place of death missing
American people of Irish descent
Writers from Queens, New York
Cornell University alumni
United States Army soldiers
American Academy of Dramatic Arts alumni
American people of British descent
American male dramatists and playwrights
20th-century American dramatists and playwrights
20th-century American male writers
Screenwriters from New York (state)
Screenwriters from Ohio